ANEC may refer to:

 A&N Electric Cooperative - Utility cooperative serving the Eastern Shore of Virginia and Smith Island, Maryland
 Air Navigation and Engineering Company - British aircraft manufacturer in 1919
 The European consumer voice in standardisation - representing the collective European consumer interest in (technical) standards